Ebb Tide is a 1922 American silent adventure film produced by Famous Players-Lasky and distributed by Paramount Pictures, directed by George Melford, and based on the 1894 novel The Ebb-Tide by Robert Louis Stevenson and his step-son Lloyd Osbourne. The story had been filmed before in 1915 by the Selig Polyscope Company.

The film would be filmed again in 1937 and in 1947 as Adventure Island. Melford's production is now considered a lost film.

Plot
Based on a review in a film publication, Ruth Attwater (Lee) lives with her father Richard Attwater (Beery) on an uncharted island in the South Seas. She has never seen another white man, and her father threatens to kill any who come to the island.

Three derelicts are brought by fate by their boat to the island, and Richard invites them to dinner so he can show his collection of pearls and then kill them if they do not immediately leave. Robert Herrick (Kirkwood), an Englishman who has made a failure of his life, sees Ruth and decides not to leave but hides. Captain Davis (Fawcett) and Huish (Hatton) plan to rob Richard of the pearls. They come ashore with a flag of peace, but Richard suspects their intentions and masters them.

Robert and Ruth escape to the boat in the harbor, but Richard pursues them. The boat catches fire killing Richard. Ruth and Robert jump into the sea and are attacked by an octopus, but natives rescue them.

Cast
Lila Lee as Ruth Attwater
James Kirkwood as Robert Herrick
Raymond Hatton as J.L. Huish
George Fawcett as Captain Davis
Noah Beery as Richard Attwater
Jacqueline Logan as Tehura

See also
Ebb Tide (1937)
Adventure Island (1947)

References

External links

Ebb Tide Lantern slide plate; coming attraction advertisement(Wayback Machine)
Southseascinema.org

1922 films
American silent feature films
Lost American films
Films based on British novels
Films directed by George Melford
Paramount Pictures films
Famous Players-Lasky films
Films based on works by Robert Louis Stevenson
1922 adventure films
American adventure films
Films set in Oceania
Films set on islands
American black-and-white films
1922 lost films
Lost adventure films
1920s American films
Silent adventure films